Sinead Marie Boucher (née O'Hanlon; born 26 June 1970) is a New Zealand journalist and chief executive of Stuff Ltd. On 31 May 2020 she became the owner of Stuff Ltd.

Early life and family
Born in 1970 to Sean and Mary O'Hanlon, Boucher moved with her family from Belfast, Northern Ireland, to Christchurch, New Zealand, when she was about three years old. She was educated at Villa Maria College. After beginning to study law at the University of Canterbury, she dropped out and worked at McDonald's, before returning to Ireland for a time.

In 1992, she returned to New Zealand and completed a six-month journalism course at Aoraki Polytechnic in Timaru, where she met her future husband, Mark Boucher. The couple married in 2003 and they have three children.

Career
In 1993, Boucher was employed by Fairfax as the North Canterbury branch office reporter for The Press newspaper.

In 1999, Boucher moved with her future husband Mark to London, where she worked for the Financial Times on its website FT.com and at Reuters’ London bureau.

Boucher returned to New Zealand in 2003 and was appointed as an assistant editor at The Press, working on the newspaper's website. In 2007, she became Fairfax's first group digital editor, working on the Stuff website. In 2013, she became the group executive editor at Fairfax.

Boucher was appointed chief executive officer of Stuff Ltd in August 2017. In 2018, she described her priorities as CEO as to not only make a profit, but provide an internal environment for her people to connect and flourish. Her plan was to diversify the company away from a reliance on publishing revenues, to a range of initiatives that would give the company "a more stable and sustainable fate".

Purchase of Stuff Ltd 
On 25 May 2020, Nine Entertainment agreed to sell Stuff to Boucher for NZ$1, with the transaction due to be completed by 31 May. Under the terms of the transaction, Nine will retain some of the proceeds of the sale of wholesale broadband business Stuff Fibre to telecommunications company Vocus Group, and ownership of Stuff's Wellington printing press. At the time of the announcement, she said the purchase gave Stuff "a real chance to take our destiny into our own hands and forge a really bright new future". She also said she intended to pursue giving staff the opportunity to purchase a share in the company, and wanted to enshrine the independence of editorial functions from owners i.e. herself and future share-owners.

Awards 
In 2012, Boucher was awarded the Wolfson Fellowship prize, the most prestigious journalism prize in New Zealand, which involves a 10-week stay at Cambridge University.

References

External links

Living people
Northern Ireland emigrants to New Zealand
People educated at Villa Maria College, Christchurch
New Zealand journalists
New Zealand chief executives
Year of birth missing (living people)
1970 births